Abdollah Givi (also Romanized as ‘Abdollāh Gīvī; also known as ‘Abdollāh Gīv) is a village in Sarvelayat Rural District, Sarvelayat District, Nishapur County, Razavi Khorasan Province, Iran. At the 2006 census, its population was 469, in 135 families.

See also 

 List of cities, towns and villages in Razavi Khorasan Province

References 

Populated places in Nishapur County